Thomas Brudenell-Bruce, 1st Earl of Ailesbury, KT (30 April 1729 – 19 April 1814), styled The Honourable Thomas Brudenell until 1747 and known as The Lord Bruce of Tottenham between 1747 and 1776, was a British courtier.

Background and education
Born Thomas Brudenell, he was the youngest son of George Brudenell, 3rd Earl of Cardigan and Lady Elizabeth Bruce. He was the younger brother of George Montagu, 1st Duke of Montagu, James Brudenell, 5th Earl of Cardigan and the Honourable Robert Brudenell. He was educated at Winchester College. In February 1747, aged 17, he succeeded his uncle, the 4th Earl of Elgin and 3rd and last Earl of Ailesbury, as 2nd Baron Bruce of Tottenham according to a special remainder in the letters patent. In 1767 he assumed by Royal licence the additional surname of Bruce.

Public life

Lord Bruce served as a Lord of the Bedchamber to King George III, and was briefly in May 1776 Governor to the Prince of Wales and Prince Frederick. In June 1776 he was created Earl of Ailesbury (later styled Aylesbury), in the County of Buckingham, a revival of the earldom which had become extinct on his uncle's death. He subsequently served as Lord Lieutenant of Wiltshire from 1780 to 1782, as Lord Chamberlain to Queen Charlotte from 1780 to 1792 and as Treasurer to Queen Charlotte from 1792 to 1814.

On 29 November 1786 he was made a Knight of the Order of the Thistle.

Family
Lord Ailesbury married firstly, Susanna Hoare, daughter of the banker Henry Hoare and widow of Charles Boyle, Viscount Dungarvan, on 17 February 1761; her only child from her first marriage was Henrietta O'Neill, later a successful poet. They had five children:

Lady Caroline Anne Brudenell-Bruce (d. 1824), died unmarried.
George Brudenell-Bruce, Lord Bruce (1762–1783), died unmarried.
Lady Frances Elizabeth Brudenell-Bruce (1765–1836), married Sir Henry Wright-Wilson, MP for St Albans.
Hon. Charles Brudenell-Bruce (1767–1768), died in infancy.
Charles Brudenell-Bruce, 1st Marquess of Ailesbury (1773–1856).

Susanna, Countess of Ailesbury, died on 4 February 1783. Lord Ailesbury married as his second wife Lady Anne Elizabeth Rawdon (1753-1813), eldest daughter of John Rawdon, 1st Earl of Moira, on 14 February 1788. There were no children from this marriage. She died on 8 January 1813. Lord Ailesbury died at Seamore Place, Mayfair, London, in April 1814, aged eighty-four. He was succeeded in the earldom by his third but only surviving son, Charles, who was created Marquess of Ailesbury in 1821.

Gallery

Bibliography

Manuscripts
 correspondence and papers 
 papers
 miscellaneous correspondence 1753-1809 
 1796-1807 correspondence with Duke of Buccleuch
 196-1807 Letters to Sir R J Buxton
 correspondence with Lord Elgin
 1766-68 - ten letters to Lord Rockingham.

Sources

References

External links

Ailesbury
Brudenell Bruce

1729 births
1814 deaths
People educated at Winchester College
Earls of Ailesbury
Knights of the Thistle
Lord-Lieutenants of Wiltshire
Thomas
Younger sons of earls